The FIA WTCR Race of Hungary, previously FIA WTCC Race of Hungary, is a round of the World Touring Car Cup, currently held at the Hungaroring near the city of Budapest.

The race makes it debut in the World Touring Car Championship as the 4th round, and as a replacement for the Moroccan round after it was dropped as "the local promoter was unable to commit to an agreement for the organisation of the event."

The Race debut in 2011 saw the dominating Chevrolet drivers of Alain Menu and Yvan Muller take victories and make full advantage of championship leader Rob Huff's poor qualifying and race results. The first race saw a first podium for Javier Villa, a Spanish driver debuting in the WTCC who shared the podium with local driver Norbert Michelisz in the BMW.

Race 2 was affected by rain in the middle bulk of the race, Robert Huff failed to score whilst after a double win in the previous round at Monza, whilst Yvan Muller and Alain Menu had a Chevrolet one-two ahead of Gabriele Tarquini.

The debut Hungarian round was the fourth round of the championship.

The circuit continued to host the round when the WTCC was renamed the FIA World Touring Car Cup in 2018.

Winners

FIA European STC years:
Hungaroring also hosted rounds in the predecessor of the WTCC in 2000 and 2001 during its initial Super Touring era.

References

 
Hungary
World Touring Car Championship
Hungary